The Entrance North (colloquially "North Entrance") is a coastal village in The Entrance District of the Central Coast region of New South Wales, Australia. It is at the end of a peninsula with Tuggerah Lake to the west and the Tasman Sea to the east. To the south is The Entrance Channel in which flows  Tuggerah Lake and on the southern shore is  The Entrance. Crossing the channel by foot or road is via The Entrance Bridge. It is part of the  local government area.

Education 

Children from The Entrance North are in the area for The Entrance Public School and  Our Lady of the Rosary School. 
The former The Entrance North Public School closed in 1989 due to low enrolments, having operated for ca. 65 years. The site is currently an annex of Glenvale Special School.

Transport 

The Entrance North is serviced by The Entrance Red Bus Service with routes mainly going south to The Entrance and from there to Gosford or Wyong. There is a route which continues north to Toukley and Wyong Hospital. As a flat area the area is easy to cycle around and to cross the bridge to connect with the Tuggerah Lakes bike track at Picnic Point.
The closest railway station is Tuggerah railway station which is serviced by the Central Coast & Newcastle Line.

Shops 

The Entrance North has a corner shop for milk, bread, soft drinks. The main shopping and commercial area is across the bridge at The Entrance where Coles supermarket, bakery, banks, RMS, library, post office, cafes and other mainly independent retailers trade.

References

Suburbs of the Central Coast (New South Wales)